Closure was a Canadian alternative rock band.

History
Closure formed in 2002 in Vancouver, British Columbia and previously signed to TVT Records. The band released their first album, a self-titled album, in 2003. The album received mediocre reviews.  The album produced one single and music video "Look Out Below".  "Look Out Below" was included in the 2003 film Darkness Falls courtesy of TVT Records.

The band started a MySpace page and recorded a few tracks privately. The group disbanded in 2006 after being dropped from their label; lead singer Brian Howes, moved on to become an award-winning producer.

Album

 Closure (2003)
 "Look Out Below"
 "Afterglow"
 "Oxygen"
 "What it's All About"
 "Whatever Made You"
 "Crushed
 "Lie to Me"
 "Live Again"
 "I Don't Mind (The Rain)"
 "Fragile"
 "You Are My Hatred"

Members
Brian Howes - lead vocals, guitar
Axel Gimenez - guitar
Brian Jennings - bass, backup vocals
Robin Diaz - drums

References

External links
Closure's MySpace Page

Musical groups established in 2002
Musical groups from Vancouver
Canadian alternative rock groups
TVT Records artists
2002 establishments in British Columbia